The 69th FIFA Congress was held in Paris expo Porte de Versailles in Paris, France, on 5 June 2019.

2019 presidential election
On 13 June 2018, during the 68th FIFA Congress in Moscow, incumbent FIFA President Gianni Infantino announced his candidacy for a second term. After the deadline on 5 February 2019, he was the only candidate. Consequently, he was assured to be reelected as FIFA President.

Voting results

References

External links
FIFA Congress official page

FIFA Congresses
2019 in association football
2019 in French sport
2019 conferences
Sport in Paris
2010s in Paris
June 2019 sports events in France